Periphery III: Select Difficulty is the fifth studio album by American progressive metal band Periphery. The album was released July 22, 2016 through Sumerian Records, and was produced by Misha Mansoor and Adam Getgood. The opening track, "The Price Is Wrong", was nominated for Best Metal Performance in the 59th Annual Grammy Awards. It is the last album the band released on this label. It is also the last album to feature bassist Adam "Nolly" Getgood as an official member of Periphery before he left the band in 2017, though he still returned on Periphery IV: Hail Stan to produce, engineer, and mix the album, in addition to contributing final bass parts.

Critical reception 

At Metacritic, which assigns a normalized rating out of 100 to reviews from mainstream critics, the album has an average score of 70 out of 100 based on 5 reviews, indicating "generally favorable reviews". Calum Slingerland of Exclaim! praised the band's "drive to keep exploring out of their stylistic box". Prog Sphere's Stefan Andonov stated that "Select Difficulty is by far their most diverse album, they have grown and have found a way to combine complex sounding vibe with the popular one."

Track listing

Personnel 

Periphery
 Spencer Sotelo – lead vocals
 Misha "Bulb" Mansoor – guitar, synths
 Jake Bowen – guitar, synths
 Mark Holcomb – guitar
 Adam "Nolly" Getgood – bass, guitar
 Matt Halpern – drums, percussion

Production
 Misha "Bulb" Mansoor – production
 Adam "Nolly" Getgood – mixing, engineering
 Ermin Hamidovic – mastering
 Taylor Larson – vocal production
 Spencer Sotelo – vocal production
 Jason Richardson – additional vocal tracking
 Pete Adams – additional vocal tracking
 Randy Slaugh – live orchestra, choir production, engineering
 Ken Dudley – orchestral sessions mixing

Additional personnel
 Emily Rust – violin
 Cymrie Van Drew – violin
 Megumi Terry – violin
 Caryn Bradley – viola
 Kelsey Clegg – viola
 Clayton Wieben – viola
 Chris Morgan – cello
 Robert Willes – cello
 Adam Heyen – French horn
 Tyler Arndt – trumpet
 Tom Francis – bass trombone
 Austin Bentley – choir
 Tiffany Yeates – choir
 Jonathan Allred – choir
 Randy Slaugh – choir
 Eric Slaugh – choir
 Jeffrey Slaugh – choir
 Hayley Malesich – choir
 Kelsey Clegg – choir
 Clayton Wieben – choir
 Taylor Larson – choir
 Emily Piriz – choir
 Nick Day – choir
 Jake Bowen – choir

Charts

References 

Periphery (band) albums
2016 albums
Sumerian Records albums
Century Media Records albums
Roadrunner Records albums